HMS Crescent was a first class cruiser of the  in the British Royal Navy. Crescent, and her sister ship , were built to a slightly modified design and are sometimes considered a separate class. She was launched in 1892, saw early service at the Australia Station and the North America and West Indies Station, served in the First World War, and was sold for breaking up in 1921.

Construction
She displaced . Armament consisted of two 9.2-inch guns, on the ships centreline, backed up by ten six-inch guns, of which four were in casemates on the main deck and the remainder behind open shields. Twelve 6-pounder and four 3-pounder guns provided anti-torpedo-boat defences, while four 18 inch (450 mm) torpedo tubes were fitted.

She was built at Portsmouth and launched on 30 March 1892.

Service history

Crescent had her first commission at the Australia Station. On 11 January 1895 she left Australia under Captain Arbuthnot.

From 1899 until 1902 she was flagship of Vice-Admiral Sir Frederick Bedford, Commander-in-Chief North America and West Indies Station, which had headquarters at Bermuda and (during summer) Halifax. Under the command of Captain Charles John Graves-Sawle she visited Trinidad and Jamaica in February 1900, and the following month Nassau, Bahamas to assist , stranded there with a broken shaft. Captain Stanley Colville was appointed in command on 1 March 1900, but did not actually take command of the ship until later. Commander Henry Hervey Campbell was appointed in command in May 1902, and she took part in coronation celebrations at the Halifax headquarter in that year. She arrived at Spithead on 24 July, but her commission was prolonged so she could take part in the fleet review held there on 16 August 1902 for the coronation of King Edward VII. Following the review, the King went on a tour westwards along the coast, with Crescent as escort ship, and she only returned to Portsmouth in early September, paying off there on 3 October for a complete overhaul.

She served in the First World War, and was sold on 22 September 1921 for breaking up in Germany.

Notes

References
 
 Roger Chesneau and Eugene M. Kolesnik, ed., Conway's All the World's Fighting Ships 1860–1905, (Conway Maritime Press, London, 1979),

External links

 

Edgar-class cruisers
Ships built in Portsmouth
Victorian-era cruisers of the United Kingdom
World War I cruisers of the United Kingdom
1892 ships